Cochylimorpha emiliana is a species of moth of the family Tortricidae. It is found in China (Heilongjiang, Qinghai), Mongolia, Russia and Turkmenistan.

References

Moths described in 1919
Cochylimorpha
Moths of Asia